Joel Finlay (born 30 December 1945) is a Canadian rowing coxswain. He competed in the men's coxed eight event at the 1968 Summer Olympics.

References

1945 births
Living people
Canadian male rowers
Olympic rowers of Canada
Rowers at the 1968 Summer Olympics
Rowers from Vancouver
Coxswains (rowing)